KN Luitel (born 28 April 1993) is an Indian cricketer. He made his Twenty20 debut for Sikkim in the 2018–19 Syed Mushtaq Ali Trophy on 21 February 2019.

References

External links
 

1993 births
Living people
Indian cricketers
Sikkim cricketers